Meadowdale may refer to:
Meadowdale High School (Washington), Lynnwood, Washington
Meadowdale High School (Ohio), Dayton, Ohio
Meadowdale International Raceway
Carpentersville, Illinois, whose northern section is a formerly-independent subdivision called Meadowdale